is a Japanese politician of the Liberal Democratic Party, a member of the House of Representatives in the Diet (national legislature). A native of Mitsu District, Okayama and graduate of Keio University, he was elected to the House of Representatives for the first time in 1986.

In 2003, he was appointed as Senior Vice-Minister for the Ministry of Foreign Affairs (Japan).

He was appointed as Chairmen of several Standing Committees of House of Representatives; Committee on Foreign Affairs in 1997, Committee on Rules and Administration in 2006, Committee on Budget in 2007 and Committee on Fundamental National Policies in 2014.

He serves as Vice-President of the Japan Scout Parliamentary Association.

He is known to have strong ties with the sect Moon.

References

External links 
  

Members of the House of Representatives (Japan)
Living people
1954 births
Scouting in Japan
People from Okayama
Liberal Democratic Party (Japan) politicians
Keio University alumni
21st-century Japanese politicians